Robin Morton may refer to:
Robin Morton (musician), Irish folk musician
Robin Morton (cycling), American cycling team manager